This is the list of cathedrals in El Salvador sorted by denomination.

Roman Catholic 
Cathedrals of the Roman Catholic Church in El Salvador:
St. John the Baptist Cathedral in Chalatenango
Cathedral-Basilica of Queen of Peace in San Miguel
Metropolitan Cathedral Basilica of the Holy Saviour in San Salvador
Cathedral of St. Vincent in San Vicente
Cathedral of St. Ann in Santa Ana
Cathedral of St. James the Apostle in Santiago de María
Cathedral of the Most Holy Trinity in Sonsonate
Catedral de Nuestra Señora de los Pobres in Zacatecoluca

See also
Lists of cathedrals

References

Cathedrals
El Salvador
Cathedrals